Alan McIntosh (born 29 July 1939) was a Welsh amateur football outside forward who played in the Football League for Cardiff City. He was capped by Wales at amateur level.

References 

Welsh footballers
English Football League players
Wales amateur international footballers
Association football outside forwards
1939 births
People from Llandudno
Sportspeople from Conwy County Borough
Living people
Llandudno F.C. players
Cardiff City F.C. players